Let's Play Domination is the debut studio album by English rock band World Domination Enterprises, released in 1988 by Mute Records' subsidiary label Product Inc.  World Dom guitarist/singer Keith Dobson re-released it on CD with bonus tracks in 2009 on his label Free Love Records.

Songs

"Message for You People" opens side one with a thud reminiscent of a blowing speaker or depth charge explosion, then a pulsing bassline followed by "drums and blistering guitar noise." According to Wyndham Wallace of The Quietus wrote that Dobsons' guitar in the song "forever redefines concepts of ‘industrial’ music." According to Trouser Press, "[t]he astonishing high-pressure racket of Let's Play Domination'''s opening salvo ("Message for You People") may send you rushing to the turntable to see if your stylus is accidentally gouging a hole in the platter."

"Ghetto Queen" and "Blu Money", the latter featuring a refrain of "I blew money that I could've bought drugs with," have been described as "ghetto punk" in their musical style. Side two of the album is more downtempo. "The Bullit Man" is followed by "The Stack Blew Jack," possibly intentionally placed next to each other in the album "as they follow the same exact start/stop blueprint and melody scheme."

 Reception 

It was included at number 89 in Alternative Press' list of the top 99 albums from 1985 to 1995. Dusted magazine wrote that "Let's Play Domination proves World Domination Enterprises had it in the mid to late 1980s, an era when a lot of people lost it, or never found it in the first place." In 2009, John Doran of the NME included the album in the magazine's "Unspun Heroes" series where the writers "[dig] up buried treasure from the depths of our collection." He called the band "truly radical post-punkers" and said that "World Domination Enterprises didn’t just bite the hand that fed. They gnawed the fingers off, chewed the bone, cartilage, skin and blood and then spat the mess back in the owner’s face." The same year, Wyndham Wallace of The Quietus'' wrote that:

Track List

All songs written by World Domination Enterprises (Keith Dobson, Steve Jameson, Digger Metters) unless otherwise indicated.  The use of uppercase and lowercase letters are as they appear on the back cover and labels of the original Product Inc. LP and CD.

The Product Inc. LP and CD both include a thank-you message from Dobson at the very end, hence the difference in run time of the 7" version of "Radio" between the two CD releases.

References

External links 

 

1988 debut albums